Alan Silva is an American musician.

Alan Silva may also refer to:

Alan Osório da Costa Silva (born 1979), Brazilian footballer
Alan Medina Silva (born 1998), Uruguayan footballer

See also
 Alan Silvia, American politician
 Alain Silver, American filmmaker